Herta Worell (20 September 1908 – 5 April 1996) was a German actress. She appeared in more than 75 films and television shows between 1934 and 1995.

Selected filmography

 You Are Adorable, Rosmarie (1934)
 If It Were Not for Music (1935)
 Girls in White (1936)
 The Coral Princess (1937)
 Tango Notturno (1937)
 Red Orchids (1938)
 Bravo Acrobat! (1943)
 Crown Jewels (1950)
 One Night's Intoxication (1951)
 Under the Stars of Capri (1953)
 The Cousin from Nowhere (1953)
 Between Time and Eternity (1956)
  (1965, TV miniseries)
 All People Will Be Brothers (1973)
 Three Swedes in Upper Bavaria (1977)

References

External links

1908 births
1996 deaths
German film actresses
Actors from Olomouc